Mordellistena madecassa is a species of beetle in the family Mordellidae.

References

madecassa
Beetles described in 1854